Return on event (ROE) is a term used in event marketing, compared to rate of return ROR, also known as return on investment ROI, which is the ratio of money gained or lost on an investment.

The initial value of an investment does not always have a clearly defined monetary value. In event marketing the purpose of an event can be awareness of a new product, trials, brand commitment, brand building, or combinations of these.
Similarly, the final value of an investment does not always have a clearly defined monetary value, but can add value to a brand instead of contributing to sales volume.

Description

Calculating your return on event (ROE):
Collect the number of people who has been directly in contact with your event (received a sample, recorded a song, had a picture taken etc. etc.)
The amount of money invested by the client
Collect the number of people who have been indirectly in contact with your event (bystanders, people who have passed and seen the event)
Calculate your “price pr. contact” (separate for direct and indirect contacts) by dividing number of contacts by amount of money invested
Record video footage or observe over a period of time, to analyze an estimate of the time period that people dwell at your event to find your dwell time.
Besides the clearly defined value above, an event can for example contribute in social media by gaining “likes” or followers on Facebook, Twitter, and similar, connecting to the existing “fans” and or followers on Facebook, Twitter, etc.
Return on event is also a valuable tool in the sales phase, and should be implemented before the event, to set goals and guidelines for the event. Event marketing companies can use return on event to analyze and present to the client, facts, estimated contacts, contact price etc., before the proposed event.
Return on event after the event will be clearly defined, and can be used by the client to show the impact of the event.

References 

Marketing analytics
Customer relationship management